Citizenship of Serbia is regulated by the Citizenship Law of the Republic of Serbia, adopted in 2004 and based primarily on the principle of Jus sanguinis. Article 23 of the citizenship law stipulates that any foreign national with Serbian descent has the right to acquire Serbian citizenship by written request. The law also allows dual citizenship, allowing an individual the right to retain his or her current citizenship and receive Serbian citizenship.

The 2007 amendments enabled ethnic Serbs residing outside Serbia the right to citizenship. These amendments, adopted after the Montenegrin independence referendum, 2006, also allowed citizens of Montenegro living in Serbia the right to gain citizenship, if they submit the request within a 5-year period.

Acquisition of citizenship
 Acquiring citizenship by descent - Citizenship by descent is limited to one generation (either parent must be registered as Serbian at time of birth) and the applicant cannot be older than 23 years of age at the time.
 Acquiring citizenship by birth
 Acquiring citizenship by admission (naturalization) - Must have three years of uninterrupted permanent residence in Serbia.

Termination and reacquisition of citizenship
 Termination of citizenship by release
 Termination of citizenship by renunciation
 Reacquisition of citizenship by the Republic of Serbia

Visa requirement for Serbian citizens

In 2015, Serbian citizens had visa-free or visa on arrival access to 110 countries and territories, ranking the Serbian passport 43rd in the world according to the Visa Restrictions Index.

The Serbian passport is one of the 5 passports with the most improved rating globally since 2006 in terms of the number of countries that its holders may visit without a visa.

Notable naturalized people
Arkady Vyatchanin, sportsman.
Charles Jenkins, sportsman.
Cléo, sportsman.
Danielle Page, sportswoman.
DeMarcus Nelson, sportsman.
Dmitrij Gerasimenko, sportsman.
Evandro Goebel, sportsman.
Mohammed Dahlan, Palestinian politician.
Steven Seagal, American actor.
Ralph Fiennes, English actor.
Arnaud Gouillon, French humanitarian.
Charles Cather, American youtuber.
Obiora Odita, sportsman.
Victor Ponta, Romanian politician.
El Fardou Ben Nabouhane, Comorian football player.
Richard Odada, Kenyan football player.
Yvonne Anderson, American basketball player.
Corey Walden, American basketball player.
Yingluck Shinawatra, Thai politician.

See also
 Citizenship
 Nationality law
 Serbian passport

References

Serbian citizenship
Law of Serbia